Ludwig Carl August Klindworth was a nineteenth-century German mechanic and entrepreneur. He was an instructor of the later manufacturer, civil director and senator Conrad Bube. He was honoured in 1837 by the trade association of the Kingdom of Hanover with the Golden Needle Award "for his machines to weaving and spinning mills", including the mechanical weaving machine.

Family
Klindworth was born on 5 June 1791 in Göttingen as the second son of the Göttinger mechanic and clockmaker Johann Andreas Klindworth (1742–1813) and Friederica Eleonora Klindworth, née Diedrich. His elder brother was Karl Friedrich Felix Klindworth (c. 1788-1851), who took over his father's business at the same time to ensure the oppressive obligation for the upkeeping of his mother and siblings, and his younger brother was politician and State Council Georg Klindworth. In 1785 Carl Augustus married Dorothea Wilhelmine (1800–1853), née Lamminger, the daughter of court printer Johann Thomas Lamminger (1757–1805). Their first son was classical composer and pianist Karl Klindworth.

Life
Following the traditions of the craftsmen of the University of Göttingen, Carl August Klindworth built mathematical, physical and optical instruments to his establishment in Hanover. In 1831 he constructed the first 1 HP steam machine of the
Kingdom of Hanover for the water supply of the City Hospital in Linden. In 1836 he founded a machine factory which supplied, among other parts and equipment for fire engines, rolling mills and printing presses. In the mid-1840s, Klindworth's firma was known in the address book of the city of Hanover as "machine shop and mechanical workshop", and also recommended in 1860 for "spectacles, lorgnettes, theater perspectives, barometers, gold scales, thermometers, etc. Klindworth died in Hannover on 29 June 1862.

Additional informations

Sources
R. Hartmann: History of the city of Hanover from the oldest times to the present, Second Edition, 1886, p. 1185
Albert Lefèvre: The contribution of the Hanoverian industry to the technical progress, in: Hannoversche geschichtsblätter, New Series 24 (1970), pp. 186, 274
Louis Hoerner: Agents, Barber and copyists. Hanoverian commercial ABC 1800-1900, ed. of the People's Bank of Hannover, Hannover 1995, p. 90
 Waldemar R. Röhrbein: Klindworth, Carl August, in Stadtlexikon Hannover, p. 353

References

This article is based on the translation of the corresponding article on the German Wikipedia. A list of contributors can be found there at the History section.

1791 births
1862 deaths
Technicians
19th-century German businesspeople